Renārs Krastenbergs (born 26 December 1998) is a Latvian professional ice hockey player for AIK of the HockeyAllsvenskan (Allsv) and the Latvian national team.

He represented Latvia at the 2021 IIHF World Championship.

Career statistics

Regular season and playoffs

International

References

External links

1998 births
Living people
AIK IF players
Dinamo Riga players
EC VSV players
Expatriate ice hockey players in Austria
Expatriate ice hockey players in Canada
Expatriate ice hockey players in the United States
Latvian expatriate ice hockey people
Latvian expatriate sportspeople in Austria
Latvian expatriate sportspeople in Canada
Latvian expatriate sportspeople in the United States
Latvian ice hockey centres
Latvian ice hockey left wingers
Oshawa Generals players
Södertälje SK players
Sportspeople from Jelgava
Wheeling Nailers players
Ice hockey players at the 2022 Winter Olympics
Olympic ice hockey players of Latvia
Latvian expatriate sportspeople in Sweden
Expatriate ice hockey players in Sweden